The unity of opposites is the central category of dialectics, said to be related to the notion of non-duality in a deep sense. It defines a situation in which the existence or identity of a thing (or situation) depends on the co-existence of at least two conditions which are opposite to each other, yet dependent on each other and presupposing each other, within a field of tension.

Ancient philosophy
The unity of opposites was first suggested to the western view by Heraclitus (c. 535 – c. 475 BC), a pre-Socratic Greek thinker. Philosophers had for some time been contemplating the notion of opposites. Anaximander posited that every element had an opposite, or was connected to an opposite (water is cold, fire is hot). Thus, the material world was said to be composed of an infinite, boundless apeiron from which arose the elements (earth, air, fire, water) and pairs of opposites (hot/cold, wet/dry). There was, according to Anaximander, a continual war of opposites

Anaximenes of Miletus, a student and successor of Anaximander, replaced this infinite, boundless arche with air, a known element with neutral properties. According to Anaximenes, there was not so much a war of opposites, as a continuum of change.

Heraclitus, however, did not accept the Milesian monism and replaced their underlying material arche with a single, divine law of the universe, which he called Logos. The universe of Heraclitus is in constant change, while remaining the same. That is to say, when an object moves from point A to point B, a change is created, while the underlying law remains the same. Thus, a unity of opposites is present in the universe simultaneously containing difference and sameness. An aphorism of Heraclitus illustrates the idea as follows:

The road up and the road down are the same thing. (Hippolytus, Refutations 9.10.3)

This is an example of a compresent unity of opposites. For, at the same time, this slanted road has the opposite qualities of ascent and descent. According to Heraclitus, everything is in constant flux, and every changing object contains at least one pair of opposites (though not necessarily simultaneously) and every pair of opposites is contained in at least one object.

Heraclitus also uses the succession of opposites as a basis for change:

Cold things grow hot, hot things grow cold, a moist thing withers, a parched thing is wetted. (DK B126)

An object persists despite opposite properties, even as it undergoes change.

Medieval philosophy

Coincidentia oppositorum
Coincidentia oppositorum is a Latin phrase meaning coincidence of opposites.  It is a neoplatonic term attributed to 15th century German polymath Nicholas of Cusa in his essay, De Docta Ignorantia (1440).  Mircea Eliade, a 20th-century historian of religion, used the term extensively in his essays about myth and ritual, describing the coincidentia oppositorum as "the mythical pattern".  Psychiatrist Carl Jung, the philosopher and Islamic Studies professor Henry Corbin as well as Jewish philosophers Gershom Scholem and Abraham Joshua Heschel also used the term.  
In alchemy, coincidentia oppositorum is a synonym for coniunctio. For example, Michael Maier stresses that the union of opposites is the aim of the alchemical work. Or, according to Paracelsus' pupil, Gerhard Dorn, the highest grade of the alchemical coniunctio consisted in the union of the total man with the unus mundus ("one world").

The term is also used in describing a revelation of the oneness of things previously believed to be different. Such insight into the unity of things is a kind of immanence, and is found in various non-dualist and dualist traditions. The idea occurs in the traditions of Tantric Hinduism and Buddhism, in German mysticism, Zoroastrianism, Taoism, Zen and Sufism, among others.

Modern philosophy
Dialecticians claim that unity or identity of opposites can exist in reality or in thought. If the opposites were completely balanced, the result would be stasis, but often it is implied that one of the pairs of opposites is larger, stronger or more powerful than the other, such that over time, one of the opposed conditions prevails over the other. Yet rather than 'stasis' the identity of opposites, there being unity within their duality, is taken to be the instance of their very manifestation, the unity between them being the essential principle of making any particular opposite in question extant as either opposing force. For example 'upward' cannot exist unless there is a 'downward', they are opposites but they co-substantiate one another, their unity is that either one exists because the opposite is necessary for the existence of the other, one manifests immediately with the other. Hot would not be hot without cold, due to there being no contrast by which to define it as 'hot' relative to any other condition, it would not and could not have identity whatsoever if not for its very opposite that makes the necessary prerequisite existence for the opposing condition to be. This is the oneness, unity, principle to the very existence of any opposite. Either one's identity is the contra-posing principle itself, necessitating the other. The criteria for what is opposite is therefore something a priori.

In his criticism of Immanuel Kant, the German philosopher Georg Wilhelm Friedrich Hegel tried to systematise dialectical understandings and thus wrote:

In his philosophy, Hegel ventured to describe quite a few cases of "unity of opposites", including the concepts of Finite and Infinite, Force and Matter, Identity and Difference, Positive and Negative, Form and Content, Chance and Necessity, Cause and effect, Freedom and Necessity, Subjectivity and Objectivity, Means and Ends, Subject and Object, and Abstract and Concrete. It is also considered to be integral to Marxist philosophy of nature and is discussed in Friedrich Engels' Dialectics of Nature.

See also
Anekantavada
Holon (philosophy)
Enantiodromia
Hieros gamos
Organic unity
Rebis
Tantra
Yinyang
Dialectical monism

References

External links
 S.M. Cohen, "Heraclitus on Change and Unity of Opposites"

Social philosophy
Rhetoric
Dialectic
Neoplatonism
Alchemical processes